The 2020 Vuelta a España is the 75th edition of the Vuelta a España, one of cycling's Grand Tours. The Vuelta began in Irun with an hilly stage on 20 October, and Stage 10 will occur on 30 October with a stage from Castro Urdiales. The race will finish in Madrid on 8 November.

Classification standings

Stage 10
30 October 2020 – Castro Urdiales to Suances,

Stage 11
31 October 2020 – Villaviciosa to Alto de la Farrapona,

Stage 12
1 November 2020 – La Pola Llaviana to Alto de L'Angliru,

Rest day 2
2 November 2020 – A Coruña

Stage 13
3 November 2020 – Muros to Mirador de Ézaro,  (ITT)

Stage 14
4 November 2020 – Lugo to Ourense,

Stage 15
5 November 2020 – Mos to Puebla de Sanabria,

Stage 16
6 November 2020 – Salamanca to Ciudad Rodrigo,

Stage 17
7 November 2020 – Sequeros to Alto de la Covatilla,

Stage 18
8 November 2020 – Hipódromo de la Zarzuela to Madrid,

References

2020 Vuelta a España
Vuelta a España stages